The 2016 United States House of Representatives election in Vermont was held on November 8, 2016, to elect the U.S. representative from the state of Vermont from Vermont's at-large congressional district. The election coincided with the 2016 U.S. presidential election, as well as other elections to the House of Representatives, elections to the United States Senate and various state and local elections. The primaries were held on August 9.

Peter Welch, a Democrat who was first elected in 2006, announced he would run for reelection, rather than run for Governor of Vermont. Welch faced no opposition in the Democratic primary, and also won the Republican primary on write-in votes; Welch accepted both nominations. Welch was re-elected with 89.5% of the vote, with Erica Clawson of the Liberty Union Party receiving 9.2%.

Democratic primary

Candidates

Declared
Peter Welch, incumbent U.S. Representative

Results

Republican primary

Candidates

Declared
 None

Results

Liberty Union primary

Candidates

Declared
 Erica Clawson

General election

Results

References

Vermont
2016
House